This is the discography of Turkish pop singer Gülşen, who has released ten studio albums and numerous singles.

Albums

Studio albums

Demo albums

Compilation albums

Singles

Charts

References

External links
 Gülşen discography at Discogs

Discographies of Turkish artists
Pop music discographies